Cycloramphus cedrensis is a species of frog in the family Cycloramphidae. It is endemic to southern Brazil and is only known from its type locality near Rio dos Cedros, Santa Catarina. Common name Cedros button frog has been coined for it.

Description
Adult males measure  and adult females  in snout–vent length. The snout is rounded. The tympanum is hidden. The toes have relatively well-developed webbing. The dorsum is brown with indistinct mottling. The sides of body and posterior surface of thighs bear distinctive small yellow dots. The chin and chest have small white dots on a maroon background. The iris is very dark brown.

The male advertisement call consists of sporadic, single notes. The call is short, lasting about 0.1 seconds. The maximum energy is at 1100–1400 Hz.

Habitat and conservation
The tadpole are found on rocks in the splash zone.

The type series was collected in 1982. As of 2004, later surveys had not found the species. It is threatened by habitat loss caused by logging and development of hydroelectricity infrastructure. It is not known to occur in any protected areas

References

cedrensis
Endemic fauna of Brazil
Amphibians of Brazil
Amphibians described in 1983
Taxonomy articles created by Polbot